Kaba So, also known as Kulfa after its primary dialect, is a Bongo–Bagirmi language of Chad. It is nearly intelligible with Kaba Na, which is used as a second language.

References

Bongo–Bagirmi languages
Languages of Chad